The 1925 French Championships (now known as the French Open) was a tennis tournament that took place on the outdoor clay courts at the Stade Français in Saint-Cloud, France. The tournament ran from 28  May until 6 June. It was the 30th staging of the French Championships but it was the first time it was staged as a Grand Slam event. It was the second Grand Slam tournament of the year. It was the first time the tournament was open to players who were neither French citizens nor residents of France. 

Suzanne Lenglen won all three events she entered; the women's singles, the women's doubles, and the mixed doubles.

Finals

Men's singles

 René Lacoste defeated  Jean Borotra, 7–5, 6–1, 6–4

Women's singles

 Suzanne Lenglen defeated  Kitty McKane, 6–1, 6–2

Men's doubles
 Jean Borotra  /  René Lacoste defeated  Henri Cochet  /  Jacques Brugnon, 7–5, 4–6, 6–3, 2–6, 6–3

Women's doubles
 Suzanne Lenglen /  Julie Vlasto  defeated  Evelyn Colyer  /  Kitty McKane, 6–1, 9–11, 6–2

Mixed doubles
 Suzanne Lenglen  /  Jacques Brugnon defeated  Julie Vlasto /  Henri Cochet, 6–2, 6–2

References

External links
 French Open official website

French Championships (tennis) by year
French Championships
French Championships
History of tennis
French Championships (tennis)
French Championships (tennis)
French